MFP may refer to:

Politics
 Member of the Flemish Parliament

Political parties
 Marematlou Freedom Party, a political party in Lesotho
 Magyar Függetlenségi Párt, a Hungarian political party after World War II
 Matabeleland Freedom Party, a separatist political party in Matabeleland, Zimbabwe
 Montenegrin Federalist Party, a political party representing Montenegrins in the Kingdom of Yugoslavia
Move Forward Party, a center-left political party in Thailand.

Software
 Macromedia Flash Player, now known as Adobe Flash Player
 MyFitnessPal, a free app and website that tracks diet and exercise

Science, Medicine
 Membrane fusion protein, a protein which makes membranes combine
 Mean free path, in kinetic theory, a term describing the path of molecules, atoms or photons
 Sodium monofluorophosphate, an ingredient in toothpastes
 Multiple fractional polynomial, a statistical method

Music
 Music for People (album), a 2000 album by the band VAST
 Music for Pleasure (record label), a record label from England

Others
 Marinefährprahm, a World War II German landing craft
 Macassar Malay (ISO 639 code: mfp), a Malay trade language
 Main Force Patrol, an Australian Federal Police unit in the Mad Max movies
 Management Frame Protection, the name used by Cisco Systems to refer to IEEE 802.11w-2009
 Master Financial Professional, a designation offered by the American Academy of Financial Management
 Mechanical fuel pump, a common type of fuel pump
 Military Foot Police, a precursor to the Royal Military Police
 Minimum Foundation Program, the formula that determines the cost to educate students at public elementary and secondary schools in Louisiana
 Multifactor productivity, a measure of the change in output per unit of input in an economic system
 Multifunction platform, a diesel generator for use in Africa
 Multifunction Polis, a proposed technology city in Australia
 Multifunction printer, an office machine that incorporates the functionality of multiple devices in one
 Music for People (organization), a non-profit organization dedicated to music-making and music improvisation as a means of self-expression
 Muzaffarpur Junction railway station (station code: MFP), a railway station in India